Daniel H. Lawrence was an American college football coach. He was the head football coach at Michigan State Normal College—now known as Eastern Michigan University—in Ypsilanti, Michigan from 1904 to 1905, compiling a record of 10–6.

Head coaching record

References

Year of birth missing
Year of death missing
Eastern Michigan Eagles football coaches